This Pulitzer Prize has been awarded since 1942 for a distinguished example of reporting on international affairs, including United Nations correspondence.  In its first six years (1942–1947), it was called the Pulitzer Prize for Telegraphic Reporting - International.

List of winners for Pulitzer Prize for Telegraphic Reporting - International
1942: Laurence Edmund Allen, Associated Press, "for reporting on the British Mediterranean Fleet."
1943: Ira Wolfert, North American Newspaper Alliance, "for a series of articles on the battle of the Solomon Islands."
1944: Daniel De Luce, Associated Press, "for his distinguished reporting during the year 1943."
1945: Mark S. Watson, The Baltimore Sun, "for distinguished reporting from Washington, London and the French and Italian fronts in 1944."
1946: Homer Bigart, New York Herald Tribune, "for distinguished war reporting from the Pacific."
1947: Eddy Gilmore, Associated Press, "for his correspondence from Moscow in 1946."

List of winners for Pulitzer Prize for International Reporting 
1948: Paul W. Ward, Baltimore Sun, "for his series of articles published in 1947 on 'Life in the Soviet Union.'"
1949: Price Day, Baltimore Sun, "for his series of 12 articles entitled, 'Experiment in Freedom: India and Its First Year of Independence.'"
1950: Edmund Stevens, Christian Science Monitor, "for his series of 43 articles written over a three-year residence in Moscow entitled, 'This Is Russia Uncensored.'"
1951: Keyes Beech (Chicago Daily News); Homer Bigart (New York Herald Tribune); Marguerite Higgins (New York Herald Tribune); Relman Morin (Associated Press); Fred Sparks (Chicago Daily News); and Don Whitehead (Associated Press), "for their reporting of the Korean War."
1952: John M. Hightower, Associated Press, "for the sustained quality of his coverage of news of international affairs during the year."
1953: Austin Wehrwein, Milwaukee Journal, "for a series of articles on Canada."
1954: Jim G. Lucas, Scripps-Howard Newspapers, "for his notable front-line human interest reporting of the Korean War, the cease-fire and the prisoner-of-war exchanges, climaxing 26 months of distinguished service as a war correspondent."
1955: Harrison E. Salisbury, New York Times, "for his distinguished series of articles, 'Russia Re-Viewed,' based on his six years as a Times correspondent in Russia. The perceptive and well-written Salisbury articles made a valuable contribution to American understanding of what is going on inside Russia. This was principally due to the writer's wide range of subject matter and depth of background plus a number of illuminating photographs which he took."
1956: William Randolph Hearst Jr., J. Kingsbury-Smith and Frank Conniff, International News Service, "for a series of exclusive interviews with the leaders of the Soviet Union."
1957: Russell Jones, United Press, "for his excellent and sustained coverage of the Hungarian revolt against Communist domination, during which he worked at great personal risk within Russian-held Budapest and gave front-line eyewitness reports of the ruthless Soviet repression of the Hungarian people."
1958: Staff of the New York Times, "for its distinguished coverage of foreign news, which was characterized by admirable initiative, continuity and high quality during the year."
1959: Joseph Martin and Philip Santora, New York Daily News, "for their exclusive series of articles disclosing the brutality of the Batista government in Cuba long before its downfall and forecasting the triumph of the Cuban revolution party led by Fidel Castro."
1960: A.M. Rosenthal, New York Times, "for his perceptive and authoritative reporting from Poland. Mr. Rosenthal's subsequent expulsion from the country was attributed by Polish government spokesmen to the depth his reporting into Polish affairs, there being no accusation of false reporting."
1961: Lynn Heinzerling, Associated Press, "for his reporting under extraordinarily difficult conditions of the early stages of the Congo Crisis and his keen analysis of events in other parts of Africa."
1962: Walter Lippmann, New York Herald Tribune Syndicate, "for his 1961 interview with Soviet Premier Khrushchev, as illustrative of Lippmann's long and distinguished contribution to American journalism."
1963: Hal Hendrix, Miami News, "for his persistent reporting which revealed, at an early stage, that the Soviet Union was installing missile launching pads in Cuba and sending in large numbers of MIG-21 aircraft."
1964: Malcolm W. Browne of the Associated Press and David Halberstam of the New York Times, "for their individual reporting of the Vietnam War and the overthrow of the Diem regime."
1965: J. A. Livingston, Philadelphia Bulletin, "for his reports on the growth of economic independence among Russia's Eastern European satellites and his analysis of their desire for a resumption of trade with the West."
1966: Peter Arnett, Associated Press, "for his coverage of the war in Vietnam."
1967: R. John Hughes, Christian Science Monitor, "for his thorough reporting of the attempted Communist coup in Indonesia in 1965 and the purge that followed in 1965-66."
1968: Alfred Friendly, Washington Post, "for his coverage of the Middle East War of 1967."
1969: William Tuohy, Los Angeles Times, "for his Vietnam War correspondence in 1968."
1970: Seymour M. Hersh, Dispatch News Service, "for his exclusive disclosure of the Vietnam War tragedy at the hamlet of My Lai."
1971: Jimmie Lee Hoagland, Washington Post, "for his coverage of the struggle against apartheid in the Republic of South Africa."
1972: Peter R. Kann, Wall Street Journal, "for his coverage of the Indo-Pakistan War of 1971."
1973: Max Frankel, New York Times, "for his coverage of President Nixon's visit to China in 1972."
1974: Hedrick Smith, New York Times, "for his coverage of the Soviet Union and its allies in Eastern Europe in 1973."
1975: William Mullen, reporter, and Ovie Carter, photographer, Chicago Tribune, "for their coverage of famine in Africa and India."
1976: Sydney H. Schanberg, New York Times, "for his coverage of the Communist takeover in Cambodia, carried out at great risk when he elected to stay at his post after the fall of Phnom Penh."
1977: No award
1978: Henry Kamm, New York Times, "for his stories on the refugees, 'Vietnamese boat people,' from Indochina."
1979: Richard Ben Cramer, The Philadelphia Inquirer, "for reports from the Middle East."
1980: Joel Brinkley, reporter and Jay Mather, photographer of Louisville Courier-Journal, "for stories from Cambodia."
1981: Shirley Christian, Miami Herald, "for her dispatches from Central America."
1982: John Darnton, New York Times, "for his reporting from Poland."
1983: Thomas L. Friedman and Loren Jenkins, New York Times and Washington Post respectively, "for their individual reporting of the Israeli invasion of Beirut and its tragic aftermath."
1984: Karen Elliott House, Wall Street Journal, "for her extraordinary series of interviews with Jordan's King Hussein which correctly anticipated the problems that would confront the Reagan administration's Middle East peace plan."
1985: Joshua Friedman and Dennis Bell, reporters, and Ozier Muhammad, photographer, Newsday, "for their series on the plight of the hungry in Africa."
1986: Lewis M. Simons, Pete Carey and Katherine Ellison, San Jose Mercury News, "for their June 1985 series that documented massive transfers of wealth abroad by President Marcos and his associates and had a direct impact on subsequent political developments in the Philippines and the United States."
1987: Michael Parks, Los Angeles Times, "for his balanced and comprehensive coverage of South Africa."
1988: Thomas L. Friedman, New York Times, "for balanced and informed coverage of Israel."
1989: Bill Keller, New York Times, "for resourceful and detailed coverage of events in the U.S.S.R."
1989: Glenn Frankel, Washington Post, "for sensitive and balanced reporting from Israel and the Middle East."
1990: Nicholas D. Kristof and Sheryl WuDunn, New York Times, "for knowledgeable reporting from China on the mass movement for democracy and its subsequent suppression."
1991: Caryle Murphy, Washington Post, "for her dispatches from occupied Kuwait, some of which she filed while in hiding from Iraqi authorities."
1991: Serge Schmemann, New York Times, "for his coverage of the reunification of Germany."
1992: Patrick J. Sloyan, Newsday, "for his reporting on the Persian Gulf War, conducted after the war was over, which revealed new details of American battlefield tactics and friendly fire incidents."
1993: John F. Burns, New York Times, "for his courageous and thorough coverage of the destruction of Sarajevo and the barbarous killings in the war in Bosnia-Herzegovina."
1993: Roy Gutman, Newsday, "for his courageous and persistent reporting that disclosed atrocities and other human rights violations in Croatia and Bosnia-Herzegovina."
1994: Staff of The Dallas Morning News, "for its series examining the epidemic of violence against women in many nations."
1995: Mark Fritz, Associated Press, "for his reporting on the ethnic violence and slaughter in Rwanda."
1996: David Rohde, Christian Science Monitor, "for his persistent on-site reporting of the massacre of thousands of Bosnian Muslims in Srebrenica."
1997: John F. Burns, New York Times, "for his courageous and insightful coverage of the harrowing regime imposed on Afghanistan by the Taliban."
1998: Staff of the New York Times, "for its revealing series that profiled the corrosive effects of drug corruption in Mexico."
1999: Staff of the Wall Street Journal, "for its in-depth, analytical coverage of the 1998 Russian financial crisis."
2000: Mark Schoofs, Village Voice, "for his provocative and enlightening series on the AIDS crisis in Africa."
2001: Ian Denis Johnson, Wall Street Journal, "for his revealing stories about victims of the Chinese government's often brutal suppression of the Falun Gong movement and the implications of that campaign for the future."
2001: Paul Salopek, Chicago Tribune, "for his reporting on the political strife and disease epidemics ravaging Africa, witnessed firsthand as he traveled, sometimes by canoe, through rebel-controlled regions of the Congo."
2002: Barry Bearak, New York Times, "for his deeply affecting and illuminating coverage of daily life in war-torn Afghanistan."
2003: Kevin Sullivan and Mary Jordan, Washington Post, "for their exposure of horrific conditions in Mexico's criminal justice system and how they affect the daily lives of people."
2004: Anthony Shadid, Washington Post, for his extraordinary ability to capture, at personal peril, the voices and emotions of Iraqis as their country was invaded, their leader toppled and their way of life upended.
2005: Kim Murphy of Los Angeles Times, "for her eloquent, wide ranging coverage of Russia's struggle to cope with terrorism, improve the economy and make democracy work."
2005: Dele Olojede of Newsday, Long Island, "for his fresh, haunting look at Rwanda a decade after rape and genocidal slaughter had ravaged the Tutsi tribe."
2006: Joseph Kahn and Jim Yardley of the New York Times, "for their ambitious stories on ragged justice in China as the booming nation's legal system evolves."
2007: Staff of The Wall Street Journal, "for reports on the adverse impact of Chinese capitalism."
2008: Steve Fainaru of The Washington Post, "For his heavily reported series on private security contractors in Iraq that operate outside most of the laws governing American forces."
2009: The New York Times staff, "for its masterful, groundbreaking coverage of America’s deepening military and political challenges in Afghanistan and Pakistan, reporting frequently done under perilous conditions."
2010: Anthony Shadid of The Washington Post, "for his rich, beautifully written series on Iraq as the United States departs and its people and leaders struggle to deal with the legacy of war and to shape the nation’s future."
2011: Clifford J. Levy and Ellen Barry of The New York Times, "for their dogged reporting that put a human face on the faltering justice system in Russia, remarkably influencing the discussion inside the country."
2012: Jeffrey Gettleman of The New York Times,  "for his vivid reports, often at personal peril, on famine and conflict in East Africa, a neglected but increasingly strategic part of the world."
2013: David Barboza of The New York Times,  "For his striking exposure of corruption at high levels of the Chinese government."
2014: Jason Szep and Andrew R. C. Marshall of Reuters "for their courageous reports on the violent persecution of the Rohingya, a Muslim minority in Myanmar that, in efforts to flee the country, often falls victim to predatory human-trafficking networks."
2015: The New York Times staff "for courageous front-line reporting and vivid human stories on Ebola in Africa, engaging the public with the scope and details of the outbreak while holding authorities accountable."
2016: Alissa J. Rubin of The New York Times, "For thoroughly reported and movingly written accounts giving voice to Afghan women who were forced to endure unspeakable cruelties."
2017: The New York Times staff, "for agenda-setting reporting on Vladimir Putin’s efforts to project Russia’s power abroad, revealing techniques that included assassination, online harassment and the planting of incriminating evidence on opponents."
2018: Clare Baldwin, Andrew R.C. Marshall and Manuel Mogato of Reuters, "For relentless reporting that exposed the brutal killing campaign behind Philippines President Rodrigo Duterte’s war on drugs."
2019: (two winners) Maggie Michael, Maad al-Zikry and Nariman El-Mofty of Associated Press, "For a revelatory yearlong series detailing the atrocities of the war in Yemen, including theft of food aid, deployment of child soldiers and torture of prisoners."; Staff of Reuters, with notable contributions from Wa Lone and Kyaw Soe Oo, "For expertly exposing the military units and Buddhist villagers responsible for the systematic expulsion and murder of Rohingya Muslims from Myanmar, courageous coverage that landed its reporters in prison."
2020: The staff of The New York Times "for a set of enthralling stories, reported at great risk, exposing the predations of Vladimir Putin’s regime."
2021: Megha Rajagopalan, Alison Killing and Christo Buschek of BuzzFeed News, "for a series of clear and compelling stories that used satellite imagery and architectural expertise, as well as interviews with two dozen former prisoners, to identify a vast new infrastructure built by the Chinese government for the mass detention of Muslims."
 	
2022: Staff of The New York Times, notably Azmat Khan, contributing writer, "For courageous and relentless reporting that exposed the vast civilian toll of U.S.-led airstrikes, challenging official accounts of American military engagements in Iraq, Syria and Afghanistan."

References

External links
Telegraphic Reporting (International) – Winners and Finalists - Past Prize Categories
International Reporting – Winners and Finalists

International Reporting
International relations